Mats Simon Hjalmarsson (born February 1, 1989) is a Swedish professional ice hockey forward. He is currently playing for Rögle BK in the Swedish Hockey League (SHL) on loan from Vaasan Sport of the Liiga.

Playing career
In the 2006–07 season, he played for the Frölunda HC in the J20 SuperElit league and Gislaveds SK in the Division I. He was among the very best players in the Swedish U20 league, scoring 54 points in 41 games. He was consequently selected by the St. Louis Blues, 39th overall, in the 2007 NHL Entry Draft.

On June 4, 2014, Hjalmarsson signed a one-year, two-way contract with the Columbus Blue Jackets of the National Hockey League. He was signed under the influence of General Manager Jarmo Kekalainen, who previously drafted Hjalmarrson whilst as a scout for the St. Louis Blues. After attending the Blue Jackets training camp for the 2014–15 season, Hjalmarsson failed to make an impression with the club and was initially reassigned to American Hockey League affiliate, the Springfield Falcons on October 3, 2014. With little interest to play North American minor league hockey, Hjalmarsson was placed on unconditional waivers in order to mutually terminate his contract with the Blue Jackets. On October 15, 2014, Hjalmarsson signalled an intent to play in the KHL when his rights were traded by his draft team, HC Sibir Novosibirsk to CSKA Moscow. On October 28, 2014, he eventually signed a two-year contract with the club.

Hjalmarsson returned to Sweden after the end of the 2015–16 season, signing for a second time with Frölunda HC of the Swedish Hockey League (SHL).

Career statistics

Regular season and playoffs

International

Awards and honors

References

External links

 Simon Hjalmarsson's profile on Hockey's Future

1989 births
Living people
Borås HC players
HC CSKA Moscow players
Frölunda HC players
Graz 99ers players
Linköping HC players
Luleå HF players
People from Gislaved Municipality
Rögle BK players
St. Louis Blues draft picks
Sportspeople from Jönköping County
Swedish ice hockey right wingers
Vaasan Sport players